The Roosevelt Reservation is the -wide strip of land owned by the United States Federal Government along the United States side of the United States–Mexico Border in three of the four border states.  Federal and tribal lands make up , or approximately 33 percent, of the nearly  total. Private and state-owned lands constitute the remaining 67 percent of the border, most of which is located in Texas.

In 1907, Theodore Roosevelt in a Presidential Proclamation (35 Stat. 2136) established the reservation in order to keep all public lands along the border in California, Arizona, and New Mexico "free from obstruction as a protection against the smuggling of goods between the United States and Mexico". Texas was excluded because Texas retained all public lands upon the Texas annexation and admittance as a state, much of which has been sold over the years to private parties.

Construction of the Trump wall along the border in  California, Arizona, and New Mexico was expedited since the reservation reduced the need to acquire additional private property.

See also
 Border War (1910–1919)
 List of Mexico–United States border crossings

References

Mexico–United States border
Presidency of Theodore Roosevelt
Smuggling